Голос Сталі is an album by the Ukrainian black metal band Nokturnal Mortum, released in December 2009. The album was mixed at M.A.R.T. Studio, Kharkiv, during August and October 2009. Mastering took place in the Mana Recording Studios, Florida, in November 2009. The album was remixed and remastered in 2014 through Heritage Records.

Track listing

Personnel 
Nokturnal Mortum
 Varggoth – vocals, guitar, cover design
 Astargh – guitar, backing vocals
 Vrolok – bass
 Bairoth – drums, percussion
 Saturious – keyboards, folk instruments
Additional musicians and production
 Odalv – drums and percussion on Моєї Мрії Острови and Шляхом Сонця
 W. Angel – clean vocals
 Alafern – violin
 Andriy Veriovkin – recording
 Serhiy Kondratiev – mixing and acoustics on Небо Сумних Ночей
 Brian Elliott – mastering
 Viktor Titov – cover design
 Sir Gorgoroth – artwork

References

External links 
 Discogs article
 Голос Сталі на Chronicles of Chaos
 Голос Сталі на Dark Side 
 Голос Сталі на Sputnikmusic

2009 albums
Nokturnal Mortum albums
Ukrainian-language albums